Taigong or Duke Tai may refer to:

Jiang Ziya ( 12th–11th century BC?), also known as Duke Tai of Qi
Bo Qin (died 998 BC?), also known as Duke Tai of Lu
Duke Tai of Tian Qi (died 384 BC)
Liu Taigong (282–197 BC), father of Emperor Gaozu of Han

See also
King Tai of Zhou